Meerman is a surname.

List of people with the surname 

 Ani Meerman, American drummer
 David Meerman Scott (born 1961), American online marketing strategist
 Johannes Meerman, (1624–1675), Dutch Golden Age mayor and diplomat
 Luke Meerman (born 1975), American politician
 Ruben Meerman (born 1971), Australian scientist, educator, author, and public speaker
 Toon Meerman (born 1933), retired Dutch footballer

See also 

 Merman

Surnames
Surnames of Dutch origin
Dutch-language surnames